Brecanavir (INN; codenamed GW640385) is a protease inhibitor which has been studied for the treatment of HIV.

In December 2006, its developer, GlaxoSmithKline discontinued further development because of insurmountable issues regarding formulation.

See also
 Darunavir
 TMC-310911

References

Abandoned drugs
Secondary alcohols
Benzodioxoles
Carbamates
Furofurans
HIV protease inhibitors
Thiazoles